The Night My Number Came Up is a 1955 British supernatural drama film directed by Leslie Norman with the screenplay written by R. C. Sherriff. The plot is based on a real incident in the life of British Air Marshal Sir Victor Goddard; his journal was published in The Saturday Evening Post of 26 May 1951. The film stars Michael Redgrave, Sheila Sim and Alexander Knox. This was Sim's final film before her retirement from acting.

Plot
A senior Royal Air Force officer is at a dinner party in Hong Kong at which one of those present, a naval commander, talks about a dream he had in which the air marshal and seven companions were flying in a Dakota which crashed on a rocky shore. The air marshal is due to fly to Tokyo the following day, but is not disturbed because many of the details differ from his planned voyage, including that a different aircraft is scheduled: a Consolidated Liberator.

However, when problems ground the planned aircraft, it is replaced by a Douglas Dakota - like the one in the dream. Then a number of additional passengers arrive, making up the total number of people on board to 13 (eight passengers and five crew members) - the same number of people as in the dream. As the flight proceeds, other circumstances occur so that eventually most of the details correspond to the dream. The Dakota has to climb to avoid bad weather, but then starts to ice up. The pilot puts it into a steep dive to shake off the ice and unfreeze the undercarriage. This succeeds, but they are now in heavy cloud and the plane has lost its guidance and radio. They believe they are heading for Yokohama Bay in Japan, but having to fly on visuals alone they need to land before sunset.

They get lost and fly around in circles. Events increasingly unfold just as in the dream, and the pilot, who knows of the premonition, starts to panic. The senior officer demands that they ditch in the sea, but the pilot wants to attempt an emergency landing on the beach. Then they run out of fuel and glide towards the mountains, but, instead of crashing as in the dream, the pilot manages to bring the aircraft down in a controlled emergency landing in deep snow on a flat section of the mountainside and all on board survive.

Cast

 Michael Redgrave as Air Marshal Hardie
 Sheila Sim as Mary Campbell
 Alexander Knox as Owen Robertson
 Denholm Elliott as Mackenzie
 Ursula Jeans as Mrs Robertson
 Ralph Truman as Lord Wainwright
 Michael Hordern as Commander Lindsay
 Nigel Stock as Pilot
 Bill Kerr as Soldier
 Alfie Bass as Soldier
 George Rose as Bennett
 Victor Maddern as Engineer 
 David Orr as Co-Pilot
 David Yates as Navigator
 Richard Davies as Wireless Operator
 Doreen Aris as Miss Robertson
 Hugh Moxey as Wing Commander
 Percy Herbert as R.E.M.E. Sergeant
 Stratford Johns as Sergeant (uncredited)

Production
The Night My Number Came Up was made by J Arthur Rank at the Ealing Studios.

Leslie Norman said he found the original magazine article and suggested it become a film. He wrote a synopsis and sent it to Michael Balcon, who agreed to make the film - although he refused to let Leslie Norman write the script (which Norman wanted to do) and insisted R.C. Sheriff get the job. Norman later said "I don't think R.C. Sheriff added anything to it."

Part of the film was shot in Hong Kong, particularly Kai Tak Airport. Norman said he was "pretty pleased with" the film but felt "Ursula Jeans was a weak link".

Reception
Film critic and historian Leonard Maltin said The Night My Number Came Up, was a "... first-rate suspense film [that] will have you holding your breath as it recounts tale of routine military flight, the fate of which may or may not depend on a prophetic dream."

In the Time Out review, Trevor Johnston saw The Night My Number Came Up as, "Clever plot construction, a plane-load of top British thesps, and smooth handling from director Leslie Norman (Barry's dad) all give good value."

The Night My Number Came Up was nominated for four 1956 BAFTA Awards: Michael Redgrave as Best British Actor, R.C. Sherriff for Best British Screenplay and for Best Film from any Source as well as Best British Film.

References
Notes

Bibliography

 Johnston, Trevor. "The Night My Number Came Up." Time Out Film Guide. London: Time Out Guides Limited, 2004. .
 McFarlane, Brian. An Autobiography of British Cinema. London: Methuen, 1997. .

External links
 
 

1955 films
1950s thriller drama films
British aviation films
British thriller drama films
Films set in Hong Kong
Films set in Japan
Ealing Studios films
Films directed by Leslie Norman
Films produced by Michael Balcon
Films scored by Malcolm Arnold
1955 drama films
1950s English-language films
1950s British films
British black-and-white films